Lee Jeong-yun (born 17 September 1996) is a South Korean judoka.

In 2017, she won one of the bronze medals in the women's 78 kg event at the Asian Judo Championships held in Hong Kong. In that same year, she also won the silver medal in her event at the 2017 Summer Universiade held in Taipei, Taiwan.

At the 2019 Asian-Pacific Judo Championships held in Fujairah, United Arab Emirates, she won one of the bronze medals in the women's 78 kg event.

In 2021, she won one of the bronze medals in her event at the Judo Grand Slam Tashkent held in Tashkent, Uzbekistan. In 2022, she won one of the bronze medals in her event at the Judo Grand Prix Almada held in Almada, Portugal. She also won one of the bronze medals in her event at the 2022 Judo Grand Slam Paris held in Paris, France.

References

External links
 
 

Living people
1996 births
Place of birth missing (living people)
South Korean female judoka
Universiade medalists in judo
Universiade silver medalists for South Korea
Medalists at the 2017 Summer Universiade
21st-century South Korean women